Luiz Carlos Machado Júnior (born 5 June 1979), known as Juninho or Júnior, is a Brazilian footballer who played as a striker.

References

Brazilian footballers
Brazilian expatriate footballers
Clube Atlético Mineiro players
Botafogo Futebol Clube (SP) players
Associação Atlética Internacional (Limeira) players
Associação Ferroviária de Esportes players
Rio Branco Esporte Clube players
Singapore Premier League players
Living people
1979 births
Expatriate footballers in Singapore
Geylang International FC players
Association football forwards
São Paulo State University alumni